The Presidential Classroom is a high school program in which students spend a week in Washington, D.C., at the Georgetown Marriott Conference Center at Georgetown University. During each one-week visit, students tour different sites in DC, including the State Department, the Capitol, the Supreme Court, Mount Vernon, Washington Monument, Jefferson Memorial, World War II Memorial, and various advocacy organizations, such as the NRA, RNC, DNC, and ACLU.  

Students hear from leading political officials and insiders about the Constitution and the current political scene, with a focus on international politics and negotiatioins. The participants were very international, as the programme attracted many exchange students which spent a year at a US high school. While more than half of the participants were non-US citizens, students from the US still were the largest group from a single country. The international students often visit embassies and meet personally with the ambassadors.

In 2012 Presidential Classroom teamed up with the Miller Center to provide an online format. It appears that it no longer has a residency format at Georgetown.

References

External links
Presidential Classroom - Official site

Final Round Contestants, Forbes, 2007
National Honor Society partnership

Non-profit organizations based in Charlottesville, Virginia
Nonpartisan organizations in the United States